Cake Wars is an American reality competition series that was first broadcast on June 29, 2015, aired on the cable TV channel Food Network, and airs reruns on Discovery Family. Jonathan Bennett hosted the competition, where four bakers face off to have their cakes featured in a special event, in addition to a $10,000 prize. Star pastry chefs Waylynn Lucas, Ron Ben-Israel and Richard Ruskell judge which cakes are worthy of headlining parties for pop culture media such as The Simpsons, The Sound of Music, DC Comics, and more. The first and fifth seasons of the show ran for eight episodes and later seasons of the show ran for thirteen episodes. There was also an annual Christmas-themed spin-off of the show called Cake Wars: Christmas, which made its debut the same year as Cake Wars.

It was announced on December 2, 2015, that Cake Wars was renewed for a second season. The new season featured themes that included Star Wars, Dr. Seuss, and Willy Wonka cakes.

Premise
The show is almost identical to Cupcake Wars, except that the contestants design their creations out of regular cakes instead of cupcakes and there are two rounds instead of three. The first round is called "Batter Up," and the contestants are required to choose a certain number of ingredients that go with the episode's theme. One contestant is eliminated after the first round, and in the second round (called "Cake Off"), each of the teams is given two more assistants to help them make their biggest creations and improve any mistakes they may have made in the first round. Before the winner is announced, one person of the three remaining contestants is eliminated, and the winner is chosen from the two remaining contestants.

Theme
The show invites cake bakers from all over the United States to compete. Each episode is centered on the theme or event; past themes include a birthday party for baby hippo from the Los Angeles Zoo, a party for the forty-fifth anniversary of the classic film Willy Wonka and the Chocolate Factory and a film festival, etc.

Judges
Just like in Cupcake Wars, almost every episode of Cake Wars has three judges (some have four judges), two of whom are permanent judges. The guest judge(s) is usually someone who has something to do with the event for the episode, or at least someone who fits in with the theme of the episode. All the judges have the opportunity to constructively critique the cake competitors after each round of battle. The three permanent judges are:
Ron Ben-Israel: Owner of Ron Ben-Israel Cakes in New York City and the former host of Sweet Genius (Seasons 1–3).
Waylynn Lucas: With voice actress-turned-baker, Nancy Truman, Waylynn Lucas is the co-founder/co-operator of "Fonuts," a healthier spin on the traditional coffee-and-donut shop. In the "Sound of Music" episode, Amy Berman filled in for Waylynn.

Episode guide

Season 1 (2015)

2015 Christmas special

Season 2 (2016)

Season 3 (2016)

2016 Christmas special

Season 4 (2016-2017)

Cake Wars Champs (2017)

Contestants

Season 1 (2015)

2015 Christmas special

Season 2 (2016)

Season 3 (2016)

2016 Christmas Special

Season 4 (2016-2017)

Cake Wars Champs (2017)

See also
 Cupcake Wars
 Halloween Wars

References

External links
 
 

Food Network original programming
Food reality television series
2015 American television series debuts
2010s American cooking television series